Laurie Hollis Glimcher (born 1951) is an American physician-scientist who was appointed president and CEO of Dana–Farber Cancer Institute in October 2016.  She was elected a Member of the American Philosophical Society in 2019.

Education 
Glimcher graduated from the Winsor School, an all-girls private school in Boston, Massachusetts, in 1968. In 1972, she graduated magna cum laude from Radcliffe College of Harvard University, and graduated cum laude from Harvard Medical School in 1976.

Work

She joined the board of directors of Bristol-Myers Squibb in 1997 and retired from the board in 2017. Her research laboratory received funding from Merck & Co for a project focused on developing new therapies for the treatment of osteoporosis in 2008.

From 1991 to 2011, Glimcher was the Irene Heinz Given Professor of Immunology at the Harvard School of Public Health, a professor of medicine at Harvard Medical School. Clinically, she is a specialist in osteoporosis.

From 2012 to 2016, Glimcher served as the Stephen and Suzanne Weiss Dean of Weill Cornell Medical College and the Cornell University Provost for Medical Affairs.

In February 2016, Laurie Glimcher was named the next president and CEO of Dana–Farber Cancer Institute. Glimcher was considered for the position for the Dean of Harvard Medical School but turned the position down in order to become the president of the Dana–Farber Cancer Institute.

At Dana-Farber, Glimcher is collaborating on research which strives to find methods of combatting cancer from within the human immune system. The Dana–Farber Cancer Institute is an institution that is affiliated with Harvard, as it currently is one of its teaching hospitals. Glimcher, who was the first female dean of any medical school in New York state, became the first female to lead the Dana–Farber Cancer Institute.

In 2017, she joined the board of GlaxoSmithKline. In 2020, she joined the board of Analog Devices.

Research
Glimcher's research has focused on the immune system; she is known for early work with T cell differentiation, her discovery that Schnurri-3 regulates osteoblasts which led to a collaboration with Merck & Co., and her discovery of the role played by XBP-1 in lipogenesis and the unfolded protein response. Glimcher's role helped discover Schnurri-3 (Shn3 for short) is a large zinc finger protein distantly related to Drosophila. Shn is a potent and essential regulator of adult bone formation. Her research has had implications for understanding asthma, HIV, inflammatory bowel disease, and osteoporosis, and around 2016, on cancer immunotherapy.

Glimcher became interested in immunology during her first year of medical school at Harvard. There she took interest dysregulation in autoimmune diseases and, in her fourth year at Harvard, discovered the protein known as Nk1.1 (see natural killer T cell), which soon became widely recognized across the field of immunology. For this discovery, Glimcher became the first woman to receive the Soma Weiss Award, an honor her father had received 26 years earlier. During this time, Glimcher worked with mentor Bill Paul, who strongly encouraged her to continue her research independently after completing medical school.

Glimcher currently heads her own lab for research in immunology. She has been interested in studying the ties between ER stress system in neurons and immune function and neuro-degeneration. Her past work has involved regulation of immune function and has shifted towards osteobiology with a focus on the bone disease osteoporosis. Her Harvard lab has a three-year contract with Merck for the drug Fosamax, a treatment for osteoporosis. Glimcher's more current research looks to answer the question, “How does the immune system and the ER stress system impact cancer development and progression?”

Awards and memberships
Glimcher received the L'Oréal-UNESCO Awards for Women in Science in 2014 for her work in the field of immunology and her research regarding the control of immune responses. In 2014, she received the Margaret Kripke Legend Award. She received the Steven C. Beering Award in 2015. In 2018, she received the American Association of Immunologists Lifetime Achievement Award.

She has been elected to the National Academy of Sciences, the National Academy of Medicine, the American Academy of Arts and Sciences and the American Philosophical Society. She is a member of American Academy of Arts and Sciences, American Association of Immunologists,  American Society for Clinical Investigation,  American Association of Physicians, and American Association for the Advancement of Science. She was the president of the American Association of Immunologists from 2003 to 2004.

In 2020 she was named the newest member of the Stand Up to Cancer Scientific Advisory Committee.

Family 
Glimcher is the daughter of Geraldine Lee (Bogolub) and Melvin J. Glimcher, who was a pioneer in the development of artificial limbs while the chair of the Massachusetts General Hospital Orthopedics Department. Her family is Jewish.

Glimcher followed in the footsteps of her father by later becoming a full professor at Harvard Medical School at the age of 39; the two became research partners.

She is married to Gregory Petsko, Professor of Neurology in the Ann Romney Center for Neurologic Diseases at Harvard Medical School and Brigham and Women's Hospital, who was director of the Rosenstiel Basic Medical Sciences Research Center and chair of biochemistry at Brandeis University prior to moving to Weill Cornell Medicine, where he became director of the Helen and Robert Appel Alzheimer's Disease Research Institute. Glimcher was previously married to Hugh Auchincloss, who was a chief of Transplant Surgery at Brigham & Women's Hospital, and is the top deputy to Dr. Anthony Fauci, with whom she had three children, Kalah, Hugh and Jake Auchincloss.

Her daughter, Kalah Auchincloss, J.D., M.P.H., is a senior vice president of regulatory compliance and deputy general counsel for Greenleaf Health and previously was deputy chief of staff for two Food and Drug Administration commissioners.

Her eldest son, Dr. Hugh Glimcher Auchincloss, is also a physician, currently a cardiothoracic surgeon at Massachusetts General Hospital.  Her younger son, Jake Auchincloss, is currently the Representative for the Massachusetts's 4th congressional district.

Women's involvement 
Laurie Glimcher has been considered a champion of women's rights in the scientific community by many of her peers. While she was at Harvard, she hired lab technicians with her own research fund to support her postdoctoral fellows after they had babies so that they were allowed to leave by 6. This carried on into Glimcher's involvement with the National Institutes of Health to create a similar postdoc grant program caring for family members.

Glimcher served on the 2005 Larry Summers Task Force for Women in Science and Engineering, where she expressed her disappointment in the rate of progress for women in science. She joined this task force after a controversy was sparked when former Harvard president Larry Summers suggested that women might be able to innately do less in science. Although she was on the Larry Summers committee, Glimcher still believes that there is still more work to be done. She was quoted as saying: "There are not enough women in senior leadership positions, period. It hasn't gotten a heck of a lot better since I was in medical school." After she was appointed to Cornell's medical school she immediately made changes regarding women's rights. She established paid maternity leave, created daycare centers and another postdoc grant program for primary caregivers. Upon arriving at Cornell there were 0 out of 19 clinical department chairs filled by women; as of today there are 2.

NYBC controversy 
In 2015, Glimcher was targeted by animal rights activists over their protest of withdrawal of support for chimpanzees in Liberia by the New York Blood Center where Glimcher had been on the board for two years.

Boston Globe Spotlight report and corporate board controversy 
When Glimcher began work at Dana Farber, she continued to serve on the board of pharmaceutical company Bristol Myers Squibb even though the company was involved in a legal battle with Dana Farber over patent rights and drug royalties. She subsequently resigned from that position and joined another pharmaceutical board, as a director of GlaxoSmithKline.  Glimcher's dual role as Dana Farber CEO and as director of multiple corporate boards was highlighted in the Boston Globe Spotlight article "Boston’s hospital chiefs moonlight on corporate boards at rates far beyond the national level," and resulted in multiple calls among Harvard physicians and Boston hospital staff for the prohibition of hospital executives from serving on corporate boards.

References

External links
Official home page at Harvard

Living people
American immunologists
Members of the United States National Academy of Sciences
Radcliffe College alumni
Harvard Medical School alumni
L'Oréal-UNESCO Awards for Women in Science laureates
21st-century American women scientists
Fellows of the American Academy of Arts and Sciences
20th-century American women physicians
20th-century American physicians
1951 births
American women chief executives
American health care chief executives
Jewish American scientists
Winsor School alumni
Members of the American Philosophical Society
Jewish women scientists
Women immunologists
21st-century American women physicians
21st-century American physicians
20th-century American women scientists
21st-century American Jews
Members of the National Academy of Medicine